The New England version of the NWA Brass Knuckles Championship was a secondary championship that was used and defended in the National Wrestling Alliance affiliated NWA New England promotion. Created in 2000, the title was used in specialty matches in which the combatants would wear brass knuckles. The championship was regularly used and defended within the promotion before being abandoned in late 2004. Throughout the history of the NWA, a number of NWA affiliated promotions used their own territorial brass knuckles championship, with the ones used in Fritz Von Erich's World Class Championship Wrestling based in Dallas, Texas and Eddie Graham's Championship Wrestling from Florida being two of the most prominent.

See also
List of National Wrestling Alliance championships
Hardcore wrestling

References

External links

National Wrestling Alliance championships
Regional professional wrestling championships
Hardcore wrestling championships